Strmac may refer to:

Strmac (Priboj), a village in the Priboj municipality, Serbia
Strmac (Užice), a village in the Užice municipality, Serbia